Phytoecia algerica is a species of beetle in the family Cerambycidae. It was described by Desbrochers in 1870. It is known from Morocco, Algeria, and Spain. It feeds on Artemisia arborescens.

Varietas
 Phytaecia algerica var. nigroanalis Breuning, 1947
 Phytaecia algerica var. borchmanni Heyrovsky, 1958
 Phytoecia algerica var. rufotibialis Pic, 1926
 Phytoecia algerica var. rabatensis Pic, 1945

References

Phytoecia
Beetles described in 1870